Kevin De Mesmaeker (born 24 July 1991) is a Belgian former professional racing cyclist, who competed professionally for  between 2013 and 2016.

References

External links
 
 
 

1991 births
Living people
Belgian male cyclists
People from Wetteren
Cyclists from East Flanders